The Archenhold Observatory was named in honour of Friedrich Simon Archenhold, is an observatory in Berlin-Treptow. It houses the Großer Refraktor (Great Refractor), which is the longest pointable telescope in the world. It is also called the Himmelskanone (Celestial Cannon).

History

Industrial Exposition 

The Archenhold Observatory began as a temporary installation at the 1896 Great Industrial Exposition of Berlin. At the initiative of Wilhelm Foerster and Max Wilhelm Meyer, it was intended to present scientific and astronomical knowledge to the general public. Plans for a large telescope that Friedrich Simon Archenhold had been working on were invoked for this purpose. Although his plans were for a research instrument, its design was already being criticised at the time. Admittance charges at the exposition were intended to finance the construction and later relocation of the instrument. The telescope was erected in the Treptower Park and sheltered in a wooden building that also provided exhibition space and a lecture theatre. When the industrial exposition opened on 1 May 1896, the Great Refractor was still unfinished; it began operation in September 1896.

Due to the late completion there was no finance to move the telescope after the exposition. At the end of 1896 the city of Berlin gave permission for the observatory to remain in Treptower Park. Archenhold, without an astronomer's salary, decided to turn the installation into a public observatory. It was operated by a society, the Verein Treptow-Sternwarte e. V. with Archenhold as president. This is now considered the oldest and largest public observatory in Germany.

The exhibition covered themes like history of astronomy, Earth and Moon, Sun and planets, comets and meteors, stars and star clusters, instruments and optics. Observations included standard objects, lunar eclipses, comets and the Nova Cygni 1903. 23,000 visitors attended in 1897, the number rising to 60,000 by 1899 and remaining about constant until the 1930s.

New building 
In 1908, the original wooden building was demolished and on 4 April 1909 a new building was inaugurated. 

On 2 June 1915, Albert Einstein gave his first public talk about General Relativity at the observatory. In 1931, Friedrich Simon Archenhold was succeeded as director by his son Günter Archenhold. Due to his Jewish ancestry, he was forced to resign in 1936. The family was expelled from the observatory; some emigrated, others ended up in Nazi concentration camps. The observatory was integrated into the city's school system. During World War II a bomb hit the southwest wing, but the Great Refractor was not severely damaged.

Observations resumed as soon as July 1945 for the solar eclipse. Edgar Mädlow was interim director, assisted by Herbert Pfaffe.

Naming after Archenhold 

In 1946 the city of Berlin renamed the observatory Archenhold-Sternwarte. On 1 June 1948 Diedrich Wattenberg, who had been working with Archenhold, was made director. Annual visitor numbers rose from 8,000 in 1946 to 25,000 in 1949. In 1958, the Great Refractor was decommissioned, but retained as a monument of technology. From 1959 onwards, the observatory was increasingly used for school education in physics and astronomy. To support this, in the 1960s, two further domes were erected in the grounds. A lecture theatre was also added, and in 1966 the solar physics cabinet was created, which could project the Sun at  diameter or a solar spectrum at  length.

In November 1976, Wattenberg retired and Dieter B. Herrmann was made director of the observatory. In March 1982, the planetarium was replaced. 1983 saw the completion of the reconstruction of the Great Refractor, which had started in 1977. Annual visitor numbers during the 1980s were around the 70,000 mark. Archenhold had already suggested a major planetarium. This became reality in 1987 when the Zeiss Major Planetarium was built in the Ernst-Thälmann-Park. Until 2013 it and the Archenhold Observatory formed a single organisational entity.

Berlin re-united 

After German reunification in 1990, the observatory came under control of the city's school administration. Significant repairs of the Great Refractor had to be carried out in 1989/1990 and 1995. As of 2018, the telescope remains operational and is available for night observing. The observatory underwent major refurbishment in 1995/1996. The exhibition was also completely revised.

Since 2002, the observatory belongs to the German Museum of Technology. Dieter B. Herrmann retired in 2005. The observatory was then led for a while by the head of the astronomy department of the technology museum, Klaus Staubermann. In 2009, Felix Lühning became director of the Archenhold Observatory.

Equipment

Great Refractor 
The Great Refractor was built in 1896 for the Great Industrial Exposition of Berlin. The lenses were made by C. A. Steinheil & Söhne. Since 1967, the telescope is a protected monument.

Zeiss Small Planetarium 
The planetarium is located in an  dome with 38 seats. In 1959 it was the first Zeiss Small Planetarium in the GDR. In 1982 it was replaced with the more modern ZKP-2 projector. In 1994 the planetarium room was refurbished.

Solar physics cabinet 
The solar physics cabinet is situated in the grounds of the observatory. It was designed and built in 1965 by Diedrich Wattenberg and Erwin Rolf. A coelostat redirects the light from the Sun into the building. The sunlight is optionally dispersed into the spectral colours through four 60° prisms. With an H-alpha filter it is possible to observe prominences and active regions on the Sun.

Additional telescopes 
In 1962, two observing domes were erected in the grounds north of the main building. They house a Zeiss Cassegrain telescope ( aperture,  focal length) and a refractor with coudé focus ( aperture,  focal length). Two further domes on the roof of the main building house an astrograph ( aperture,  focal length) and the historic Urania Refractor of 1888, which was transferred from the Berlin Urania. Two further shelters with roll-off roofs on top of the main building contain a comet seeker ( aperture,  focal length) and a Newtonian telescope ( aperture,  focal length).

See also 
 List of astronomical observatories

Reference 

 Diedrich Wattenberg: Die Archenhold Sternwarte Berlin-Treptow. Berlin 1956.
 Diedrich Wattenberg: 75 Jahre Archenhold-Sternwarte. Festgabe. Berlin-Treptow 1971 (Archenhold-Sternwarte Berlin-Treptow. Vorträge und Schriften, 41).
 Dieter B. Herrmann: 100 Jahre Archenhold-Sternwarte. 2. Auflage, paetec Gesellschaft für Bildung und Technik, Berlin 1996, .
 Dieter B. Herrmann: Sterne über Treptow – Geschichte der Archenhold-Sternwarte. (herausgegeben vom Rat des Stadtbezirks Berlin-Treptow, Abteilung Kultur) Heimatgeschichtliches Kabinett, Berlin 1986.

External links 

 Förderverein der Archenhold-Sterwarte und des Zeiss-Großplanetariums Berlin e. V.

Astronomical observatories in Germany
Museums in Berlin
Science museums in Germany
Buildings and structures in Treptow-Köpenick
World's fair architecture in Germany
Great refractors